The Ohio Country, (Ohio Territory, Ohio Valley) was a name used before 1787 for a region of North America west of the Appalachian Mountains, north of the upper Ohio and Allegheny rivers, and extending to Lake Erie. The area roughly encompassed present-day northwestern West Virginia, Western Pennsylvania, all of Ohio, and a wedge of southeastern Indiana.

Control of the territory and the region's fur trade was disputed in the 17th century by the Iroquois, Huron, Algonquin, other Native American tribes, and France. New France had claimed this area as part of the administrative district of Louisiana. France and Great Britain fought the French and Indian War over this area in the mid-18th century as the North American front of their Seven Years' War (1753–1763). Following the British victory, France ceded its territory east of the Mississippi River to them in the 1763 Treaty of Paris.

During the following decades, several minor frontier wars, including Pontiac's Rebellion and Lord Dunmore's War, were fought in the territory. In 1783, the Ohio Country became unorganized U.S. territory under the Treaty of Paris that officially ended the War of Independence, and became one of the first frontier regions of the United States. Several U.S. states had conflicting claims to portions of it, based on historic royal and colonial charters. The states' claims were largely extinguished after negotiations with the federal government in 1787, and it became part of the larger, organized U.S. Northwest Territory. Most of the former areas north and west of the Ohio River were organized as the state of Ohio, admitted to the Union in 1803.

History

Pre-colonial period

In the 17th century, the area north of the Ohio River was occupied by the Algonquian-speaking Shawnee and some Siouan language-speaking tribes, such as the Omaha and Ponca. Around 1660, during a conflict known as the Beaver Wars, the Iroquois and allied tribes seized control of the Ohio Country, driving out the Shawnee and Siouan peoples. Those tribes moved further northwest and west, with several eventually settling west of the Mississippi River. In the east, the Iroquois (or Haudenosaunee) conquered and absorbed the Erie (who also spoke an Iroquoian language) during this time. The Ohio Country, however, remained largely uninhabited for decades, used primarily as a hunting ground by the Iroquois peoples. In the 1720s, a number of Native American groups began to migrate into the Ohio Country from the east, driven by pressure from encroaching European colonists. By 1724, Delaware Indians had established the village of Kittanning on the Allegheny River in present-day western Pennsylvania. With them came those Shawnee who had historically expanded further to the east. Other eastern bands of the scattered Shawnee tribe began to return to the Ohio Country in the decades that followed. A number of Seneca and other Iroquois peoples also migrated to the Ohio Country, moving away from the Anglo-French rivalries and warfare south of Lake Ontario. The Seneca were the westernmost of the original Five Nations of the Iroquois centered in western New York. In 1722, the Tuscarora, an Iroquoian-speaking tribe from the Carolinas, completed a migration to the area and were allowed to settle near the lands of the Oneida. They were considered cousins to the Iroquois and became the sixth nation in the confederacy

Colonial period
In the late 1740s and the second half of the 18th century, the British and French angled for control of the territory. The English intended to gain control of the area by sheer number of settlers on the ground; so, in 1749 the Crown—via the government of Virginia—granted the Ohio Company a great deal of this territory on the condition that it be settled by colonists from the Thirteen Colonies.

French and Indian War
With the arrival of Europeans to America, both Great Britain and France had claimed the territory and sent fur traders into the area to do business with the Ohio Country Indians. The Iroquois League also claimed the region by right of conquest. The rivalry among the two European nations, the Iroquois nations, and the Ohio valley Indian tribes for control of the region played an important part in the French and Indian War that lasted from 1754 through 1760. Having initially remained neutral, eventually the Ohio Country Indians largely sided with the French who were more interested in hunting in the region and were not actively settling the area as was their British colonial rivals. Armed with supplies and guns from the French, the Indians launched raids against their enemies via the Kittanning Path east of the Alleghenies. After they destroyed Fort Granville in the summer of 1756, Pennsylvania's Proprietary Governor John Penn ordered Captain John Armstrong to destroy the Shawnee villages west of the Alleghenies, hoping to put an end to their raiding activities. Meanwhile, other British and colonial forces drove the French from Fort Duquesne. They built Fort Pitt at the confluence of the Allegheny and Monongahela rivers that form the Ohio River. After being defeated by Britain, France ceded their claims to the entire Ohio Country in the 1763 Treaty of Paris. They had done so, however, without consulting their Native American allies who—in many cases—continued the fight against the colonial frontiersmen.

Colonies such as Pennsylvania, Virginia, New York, and even distant Connecticut claimed some of the westward lands as had been granted by their original charters. The area, however, had been officially closed to European settlement by the Royal Proclamation of 1763, an attempt to preserve the western lands as territory exclusively set aside for use by Native American peoples. By enacting the treaty, the British Crown no longer recognized prior claims that the colonies made on this territory. On June 22, 1774, Parliament in England passed the Quebec Act that formally annexed the region to the Province of Quebec. Colonists in the Thirteen Colonies considered this one of the Intolerable Acts that contributed to the call for Colonial rebellion the following year.

American Revolution and afterward
Despite the Crown's actions limiting westward expansion, frontiersmen from the Virginia and Pennsylvania colonies had migrated across the Allegheny Mountains for over a decade since the Proclamation. This eventually led them into conflict with the Shawnee tribes that claimed the area as their hunting grounds. The Shawnee, who referred to the settlers as the 'long knives', viewed the colonists as competitors to their resources and a threat to their way of life. Because of this, the Shawnee and other Indian tribes of the Ohio Country, chose to side with the British against the American colonists during the American Revolutionary War. They hoped to expel the colonists permanently from their lands.

In 1778, after several Patriot military victories in the region by an expeditionary force led by General George Rogers Clark, the Virginia legislature organized a nominal civil government over the area. They called this first official territory Illinois County, Virginia. It encompassed all of the lands lying west and north of the Ohio River to which Virginia had previously laid claim.

The high-water mark of the Native American struggle to retain control of the region was in 1782, when the Ohio valley Indian Nations met with the British in a war council at Chalawgatha, a Shawnee village located along the Little Miami River, where they planned what was to become a successful rout of the Americans two weeks later at the Battle of Blue Licks. In 1783, following the Treaty of Paris in which America had gained its independence, Britain ceded its claims over the area to the new United States. The new federal government immediately opened this area to settlement by American pioneers, considering it unorganized territory. The Ohio Country quickly became one of the most desirable locations for Trans-Appalachian settlements, in particular among veterans of the Revolutionary War, who were often granted land in lieu of pay for their military service during the war.

In the treaties of Fort Stanwix (late 1784) and Fort McIntosh (early 1785), the United States fixed boundaries between territory open to settlement and the native tribal lands. The Shawnee and other tribes, however, continued to resist American encroachment into their historic hunting grounds. This resistance eventually led to the Northwest Indian War.

States' claims

Considered highly desirable, the area was subject to the overlapping and conflicting territorial ambitions of several eastern states:
 Connecticut claimed a strip of land across the northern part of the region, delineated by the westward extension of its northern and southern state boundaries, called the Connecticut Western Reserve.
 New York claimed an elastic part of the region based on its perceived sovereignty over the Iroquois (but the majority of four tribes, allies of the British, had resettled in Upper Quebec, or Ontario)
 Pennsylvania claimed land as a westward extension of its colonial boundaries.
 Virginia, claimed the entire region and more, originally based on the charter of the Virginia Colony. It later claimed Illinois County by right of conquest.

Incorporation of the Northwest Territory
After negotiation with the federal government, these states ceded their claims to the United States between 1780 and 1786. In July 1787, most of Ohio Country, the southern peninsula of what is today the state of Michigan, and eastern Illinois Country were incorporated as the Territory Northwest of the River Ohio. In 1803, most of what was formerly Ohio country north and west of the Ohio River was admitted to the union as the state of Ohio.

See also
 Nanfan Treaty

Notes

References

External links
 Ohio History Central: The Ohio Country
 Ohio Lands in the History Community at RootsWeb
 Ohio Territory Grant Map
 National Archives: Historical Documents Celebrating the 200th Anniversary of Ohio Statehood
 Ohio Division of Geological Survey: Map of Original Land Subdivisions of Ohio (1.9 MB pdf)
 Shawnee History

Colonial United States (British)
Louisiana (New France)
Former regions and territories of the United States
Pre-statehood history of Indiana
Pre-statehood history of Ohio
Pre-statehood history of Pennsylvania
Pre-statehood history of West Virginia
Shawnee history
Northwest Indian War
Northwest Territory
Pontiac's War
History of Pittsburgh
1750s in New France
1760s in New France
1780s in the Northwest Territory
1790s in the Northwest Territory